Michael Dennis Dunne (born October 27, 1962) is an American former professional baseball player who pitched in the Major League Baseball(MLB) from – and in .  He was a member of the 1984 U.S. Olympic Baseball Team.

Career
Dunne played baseball at Limestone Community High School and Bradley University.  He was named 1984 Missouri Valley Conference Player of the Year and graduated from Bradley with a Bachelor in Science in 1985.

As part of the United States team in baseball at the 1984 Los Angeles Olympics, he pitched two innings against Italy; the U.S. won the game, 16–1.

On June 4, he was drafted by the St. Louis Cardinals in the 1st round (7th pick) of the 1984 Major League Baseball Draft, and signed with them. He was traded to the Pittsburgh Pirates along with outfielder Andy Van Slyke and catcher Mike LaValliere for catcher Tony Peña on April 1, 1987, before he could pitch in a big league game for the Redbirds. He made his major league debut on June 5, 1987, starting against the New York Mets and Dwight Gooden.

Dunne had a fine rookie season with the Pirates, going 13–6 with a 3.03 ERA and allowing just 143 hits in 164 innings. Those numbers led to him finishing second in the National League Rookie of the Year voting to Benito Santiago. On April 21, he was traded by the Pittsburgh Pirates with minor leaguer Mark Merchant and Mike Walker to the Seattle Mariners for Rey Quiñones and Bill Wilkinson. 

Injuries then hampered much of the rest of his career. He was dealt to Seattle Mariners, and later pitched for the San Diego Padres and the Chicago White Sox. His last big league game was in 1992 for the White Sox.

Dunne's big league career covered five years and he finished with a 25–30 record and a 4.08 ERA. He pitched in 85 games, 76 of them as a starter, allowed 471 hits in 474 innings, fanned 205 and walked 225. 

Dunne became a coach at Bradley University in 2000 and has also coached youth baseball and basketball.

References

External links

1962 births
Living people
American expatriate baseball players in Canada
Arkansas Travelers players
Baseball players at the 1984 Summer Olympics
Baseball players from South Bend, Indiana
Bradley Braves baseball coaches
Bradley Braves baseball players
Calgary Cannons players
Chicago White Sox players
Gulf Coast White Sox players
Las Vegas Stars (baseball) players
Louisville Redbirds players
Major League Baseball pitchers
Medalists at the 1984 Summer Olympics
Olympic silver medalists for the United States in baseball
Pittsburgh Pirates players
San Diego Padres players
Sarasota White Sox players
Scranton/Wilkes-Barre Red Barons players
Seattle Mariners players
Vancouver Canadians players